Temple or Le Temple may refer to:

Communes in France
 Temple-Laguyon, in the Dordogne department
 Le Temple, Gironde, in the Gironde department
 Le Temple, Loir-et-Cher, in the Loir-et-Cher department
 Le Temple-de-Bretagne, in the Loire-Atlantique department
 Le Temple-sur-Lot, in the Lot-et-Garonne department
 Conchil-le-Temple, in the Pas-de-Calais department
 Dampierre-au-Temple, in the Marne department
 Ivry-le-Temple, in the Oise department
 Labastide-du-Temple, in the Tarn-et-Garonne department
 La Forêt-du-Temple, in the Creuse department
 La Ville-Dieu-du-Temple, in the Tarn-et-Garonne department
 Prunay-le-Temple, in the Yvelines department
 Saint-Étienne-au-Temple, in the Marne department
 Saint-Hilaire-au-Temple, in the Marne department
 Savigny-le-Temple, in the Seine-et-Marne department

Other
 The Temple (painting), a 1949 painting by Paul Delvaux